Mark Hawkins (born 28 December 1985) is a British handball coach, currently head coach of Norwegian club IK Våg. He was born in Horsham, West Sussex. At the 2012 Summer Olympics he competed with the Great Britain men's national handball team in the men's tournament.

Playing career
Hawkins took up handball after deciding he was too short to play basketball. At club level, he played in Iceland with Ungmennafélagið Afturelding at the time of his Olympic selection. From 2014 to 2016, he played for Ruislip Eagles.

He represented Britain at the 2012 Olympics as well as in Euro qualifying, scoring against Italy. As of 2016, he had scored 135 goals in 60 matches at international level.

Coaching
Hawkins coached Britain's teams at youth level and eventually took the role of under 20 coach, as well as assistant manager for China women's team.

References

Living people
1985 births
Handball players at the 2012 Summer Olympics
Olympic handball players of Great Britain
British male handball players